The following is a list of notable deaths in January 1999.

Entries for each day are listed alphabetically by surname. A typical entry lists information in the following sequence:
 Name, age, country of citizenship at birth, subsequent country of citizenship (if applicable), reason for notability, cause of death (if known), and reference.

January 1999

1
Myslym Alla, 79, Albanian football player and manager.
Vítor Baptista, 50, Portuguese footballer.
Besim Fagu, 73, Albanian football player.
Rafael Iglesias, 74, Argentine heavyweight boxer.
Les Yewdale, 70, Australian politician.

2
Amin al-Majaj, 77, Palestinian politician, Mayor of Jerusalem (1994–1998).
Margot Cottens, 76, Uruguayan actress.
Jean Galbraith, 92, Australian botanist, children's writer, and poet.
Sebastian Haffner, 91, German journalist and author.
Rolf Liebermann, 88, Swiss composer and music administrator.
Aase Lionæs, 91, Norwegian politician and feminist.
Joan Long, 73, Australian producer and writer.
Shepard Menken, 77, American voice actor.
Trevor J. Rees, 85, American football player and coach.
Horst Seeger, 72, German musicologist, librettist and opera director.
George Tobin, 77, American football player.
Louis Jolyon West, 74, American psychiatrist, cancer.

3
Elsa Burnett, 96, Swedish actress.
Diana Dei, 84, Italian film actress.
Neil Gibson, 36, New Zealand rower and Olympian, cancer.
Otto Königsberger, 90, German architect.
Violet Rose Olney, 87, English athlete and Olympic medalist.
Chuck Parsons, 74, American sports car racing driver.
Stanley Proffitt, 88, English cricketer.
Jerry Quarry, 53, American heavyweight boxer, pneumonia.
Jack C. K. Teng, 86, Chinese educator, writer and politician.
Gorō Yamaguchi, 65, Japanese shakuhachi player.

4
Maqsood Ahmed, 73, Pakistani cricketer.
Iron Eyes Cody, 94, American actor.
Diane Foster, 70, Canadian track and field athlete and Olympian.
Fredrik Mellbye, 81, Norwegian physician.
Charles Manners, 10th Duke of Rutland, 79, British peer and landowner.
Kisshomaru Ueshiba, 77, Japanese master of aikido, respiratory failure.
José Vela Zanetti, 85, Spanish painter and muralist.

5
Charles Francis Adams IV, 88, American electronics industrialist.
Paul Wallace Gates, 97, American historian and academic.
Michael Hirschfeld, 54, New Zealand businessman and politician, diabetes complications.
Jarmila Nygrýnová, 45, Czech long jumper, cancer.
Ralph Pasquariello, 72, American football player.
Clare Potter, 95, American fashion designer.
Basuki Resobowo, 82–83, Indonesian painter.
Paul Zoll, 87, American cardiologist.

6
David W. Dennis, 86, American politician, Representative from Indiana (1969–1975).
Jim Dunn, 67, American baseball player.
Joseph Malta, 80, American executioner during the Nuremberg executions.
Ntsu Mokhehle, 80, Lesotho politician, Prime Minister (1993–1994, 1994–1998).
Henrietta Moraes, 67, British artists' model and memoirist.
Hélène Ouvrard, 60, Canadian French writer.
Michel Petrucciani, 36, French jazz pianist, pulmonary infection.
Antonio Pierfederici, 79, Italian actor.
Lajos Tichy, 63, Hungarian footballer.
Leo Weilenmann, 76, Swiss racing cyclist.

7
Phil Cutchin, 78, American football player and coach.
James Hammerstein, 67, American theatre director and producer, heart failure.
Fred Hopkins, 51, American jazz double bassist.
Aulis Manninen, 81, American long-distance runner and Olympian.
Viktor Sobolev, 83, Soviet/Russian scientist.

8
James William Baskin, 79, Canadian politician and businessman.
Punch Coomaraswamy, 74, Malaysian–Singaporean judge, diplomat and politician, pulmonary disease.
Harvey Miller, 63, American actor, director, and screenwriter.
Vahid Musayev, 51, Azerbaijani politician, Deputy Minister, killed.
Lyusyena Ovchinnikova, 67, Soviet-born Russian film actress.
John W. Roberts, 78, American General in the United States Air Force.
Rövşən Rzayev, 29, Azerbaijani officer and war hero, murdered.
Peter Seeberg, 73, Danish modernist novelist and playwright.
Dobie Gillis Williams, 38, American convicted murderer, execution by lethal injection.

9
Rick Bennewitz, 62, American television director, heart failure.
Hans Candrian, 60, Swiss bobsledder and Olympic medalist.
Cleveland Cram, 81, American historian and intelligence official in the Central Intelligence Agency.
Carl Elliott, 85, American politician, Representative from Alabama (1949–1963, 1963–1965).
Mel Pearson, 60, Canadian ice hockey player.
Jim Peters, 80, English long-distance runner.
Mien Ruys, 94, Dutch landscape and garden architect.

10
Shinsuke Ashida, 84, Japanese actor, liver cancer.
John Hervey, 7th Marquess of Bristol, 44, British peer, aristocrat and businessman, multiple organ failure.
Walter Edward Harris, 94, Canadian politician and lawyer.
Esteban Marino, 84, Uruguayan football referee.
Frank Parker, 95, American singer and actor.
Primož Ramovš, 77, Slovenian composer and librarian.
Gavin Relly, 72, South African businessman, Chairman of Anglo American.
Edward Williams, 77, Australian judge on the Supreme Court of Queensland.
Juliusz Żuławski, 88, Polish poet, literary critic and translator.

11
Teuvo Aura, 86, Finnish politician.
Fabrizio De André, 58, Italian singer-songwriter, lung cancer.
Robert Douglas, 89, American film actor, television director and producer.
Ján Ducký, 54, Slovak politician, murdered.
Jim Dyck, 76, American baseball player.
Nathalie Lind, 80, Danish jurist and politician.
Naomi Mitchison, 101, Scottish novelist and poet.
Brian Moore, 77, Northern Irish-born Canadian screenwriter and novelist, pulmonary fibrosis.
Josefina Plá, 95, Spanish poet, playwright and art critic.
K. A. Rahman, 59, Indian political activist.
Öztürk Serengil, 68, Turkish actor and comedian.
Bobby Specht, 77, American figure skater.
François Spoerry, 86, French architect and urban planner.
Mark Warren, American television and film director, cancer.

12
Leo Cherne, 86, American economist and public servant.
Betty Lou Gerson, 84, American actress (One Hundred and One Dalmatians, The Fly, Cats Don't Dance), stroke.
David Logan, 42, American gridiron football player, respiratory failure.
Gerda Ring, 107, Norwegian stage actress and producer.
Maria Sander, 74, German sprinter.
William H. Whyte, 81, American urbanist, organizational analyst and journalist.
Doug Wickenheiser, 37, Canadian ice hockey player (Montreal Canadiens, St. Louis Blues, Washington Capitals), cancer.

13
Maurice A. Donahue, 80, American politician.
Buzz Kulik, 76, American film director and producer.
Karl Lieffen, 72, German film actor, brain cancer.
Kelvin Malone, 38, American spree killer, execution by lethal injection.
John Frederick Nims, 85, American poet and academic.
Lawrence Harold Welsh, 63, American bishop in the Roman Catholic Church.

14
Robin Bailey, 79, English actor, respiratory failure.
Tom Binford, 74, American entrepreneur and philanthropist.
Jerzy Grotowski, 65, Polish theatre director and theorist, leukaemia.
Janus Hellemons, 86, Dutch racing cyclist.
Brett King, 78, American actor, leukaemia, leukemia.
Muslimgauze, 37, British electronic musician, fungal infection.
Fred Myrow, 59, American composer, heart failure.
Sabina Olmos, 85, Argentine film actress.
Raymond Peynet, 90, French cartoonist.
Granville Rodrigo, 41, Sri Lankan actor, singer, and art director.
Barat Shakinskaya, 84, Soviet-Azerbaijani actress.
Lincoln Thompson, 49, Jamaican reggae singer-songwriter, cancer.
Aldo van Eyck, 80, Dutch architect.

15
John Bloom, 54, American actor, heart failure.
Betty Box, 83, British film producer, cancer.
Lars Glasser, 73, Swedish sprint canoeist.
Monroe Karmin, 69, American journalist and Pulitzer Prize winner.
Robert Lowry, Baron Lowry, 79, Irish judge and life peer, Lord Chief Justice of Northern Ireland (1971–1988).
Marion Ryan, 67, English pop singer.
John Baker Saunders, 44, American musician (Mad Season), heroin overdose.
Mi. Pa. Somasundaram, 77, Indian Tamil journalist, poet and writer.

16
Oscar Cullmann, 96, French Lutheran theologian.
Đoàn Khuê, 75, Vietnamese army general and Minister of Defence (1992-1997).
Jim McClelland, 83, Australian jurist and politician, Senator for New South Wales (1971–1978).
Dadie Rylands, 96, British literary scholar and theatre director.

17
Cay von Brockdorff, 83, German sculptor and art historian.
Maurice Byers, 81, Australian jurist and constitutional expert.
Nicholas J. Corea, 55, American television writer (Walker, Texas Ranger, The Incredible Hulk, Outlaws), cancer.
Theodore Major, 90, English artist.

18
Horace Cumner, 80, Welsh footballer.
Ciril Cvetko, 79, Slovene composer and conductor.
Frances Gershwin, 92, American singer and violinist.
Lucille Kallen, 76, American screenwriter and playwright, cancer.
Pat Morton, 88, Australian businessman and politician, Leader of the Opposition of New South Wales (1955–1959).
Henri Romagnesi, 86, French mycologist.
Günter Strack, 69, German television actor, heart failure.
Virginia Verrill, 82, American big band singer.

19
Roderick Chisholm, 82, American philosopher.
Ivan Francescato, 31, Italian rugby player, heart failure.
Mario Gentili, 85, Italian cyclist and Olympic medalist.
Jacques Lecoq, 77, French actor and mime, cerebral haemorrhage.
Warren Schrage, 78, American basketball player.

20
Stella Bloch, 101, American artist, dancer and journalist.
Cleaver Bunton, 96, Australia politician, mayor of Albury (NSW).
Martyn Finlay, 87, New Zealand lawyer and politician.
John Golding, 67, British trade unionist and politician, Member of Parliament (1969–1986), complications following surgery.
Frances Lander Spain, 95, American children's librarian.

21
Alfonso Corona Blake, 80, Mexican film director and screenwriter.
Charles Brown, 76, American blues singer and pianist, heart failure.
Berkeley L. Bunker, 92, American politician, Senator (1940–1942) from Nevada and Representative (1945–1947).
Jacques Chailley, 88, French musicologist and composer.
Leslie French, 94, British actor.
Paul Metcalf, 81, American writer.
Lloyd M. Mustin, 87, American admiral during World War II, complications following a stroke.
Marvin Rick, 97, American middle-distance runner and Olympian.
Cecil Smith, 94, American polo player.
Susan Strasberg, 60, American actress, breast cancer.

22
Paul Cammermans, 77, Belgian film director.
Gabor Carelli, 83, Hungarian classical tenor.
Piero Gadda Conti, 96, Italian novelist and film critic.
George Mosse, 80, German writer and historian.
Graciela Quan, 87/88, Guatemalan lawyer and women's rights activist.
Maxwell Rosenlicht, 74, American mathematician.
Steven Sykes, 84, British artist.

23
Bernard Budiansky, 73, American engineer and academic.
Joe D'Amato, 62, Italian film director, heart failure.
Jaroslav Foglar, 91, Czech author.
Pavle Grubješić, 45, Serbian football player.
Terence Lewin, Baron Lewin, 78, British Royal Navy officer, First Sea Lord (1977–1979).
Thomas C. Mann, 86, American diplomat and ambassador.
Paul McKee, 75, American football player.
John Osteen, 77, American evangelical pastor, heart failure.
Suceso Portales, 94, Spanish anarcho-feminist writer.
Jay Pritzker, 76, American entrepreneur.
Frederick Sommer, 93, Italian-American artist.
Graham Staines, 58, Australian Christian missionary, murdered.

24
Andrée Debar, 78, French actress and producer of stage and screen, Alzheimer's disease.
Elena Dobronravova, 66, Soviet and Russian actress.
Werner Jacobs, 89, German film director.
Shizue Natsukawa, 89, Japanese actress.
Roger Rondeaux, 78, French cyclo-cross racer.

25
Sarah Louise Delany, 109, American author and civil rights activist.
John H. DeWitt, Jr., 92, American radio astronomy and photometry pioneer .
Rudi Glöckner, 69, German football referee.
Philip Mason, 92, English civil servant, historian, and author.
Henri Rochereau, 90, French politician, European Commissioner for Overseas Development.
Robert Shaw, 82, American conductor, stroke.
George Gilbert Swell, 75, Indian politician.
Herman Wedemeyer, 74, American actor, football player and politician, heart failure.

26
Jeanne-Marie Darré, 93, French classical pianist.
August Everding, 70, German opera director.
Sam Jones, 75, Australian politician.
Simon Karas, 93, Greek musicologist.
D. C. Kizhakemuri, 85, Indian writer, publisher and activist.
Matilde Landeta, 88, Mexican filmmaker and screenwriter.
Heinz Leymann, 66, Swedish psychologists and academic.
Larry Loughlin, 57, American baseball player.
Charles Luckman, 89, American businessman and architect.
Ruby Mercer, 92, American-Canadian writer, broadcaster and soprano.

27
Gonzalo Torrente Ballester, 88, Spanish writer.
Eamon Collins, 44-45, Northern Irish former IRA member, murdered.
Ben Margolis, 88, American attorney, heart failure.
Satya Saha, 64, Bangladeshi composer.
Jerzy Turowicz, 86, Polish Catholic journalist and editor, heart failure.
František Vláčil, 74, Czech film director, painter, and graphic artist.

28
Ave Daniell, 84, American gridiron football player.
Josef Doležal, 78, Czechoslovak athlete and Olympic medalist.
Valery Gavrilin, 59, Soviet-born Russian composer.
Herbert Gruber, 85, Austrian film producer.
Pochiah Krishnamurthy, 51, Indian cricket player.
Roger-Jean Le Nizerhy, 82, French cyclist.
Leonard C. Lewin, 82, American author.
Rouiched, 77, Algerian comic actor.
Torgny T:son Segerstedt, 90, Swedish philosopher and sociologist.
Radúz Činčera, 75, Czech screenwriter and director.

29
Willy Bandholz, 86, German field handball player and Olympic champion.
Lili St. Cyr, 80, American burlesque stripteaser.
Yves Hervouet, 77, French sinologist.
Vladimir Kirillin, 86, Soviet physicist.
Eeva-Kaarina Volanen, 78, Finnish actor.

30
Branko Fučić, 78, Croatian art historian, archeologist and paleographer.
Romano Garagnani, 61, Italian skeet shooter and Olympic medalist.
Mills E. Godwin, 84, American politician, Governor of Virginia (1966–1970, 1974–1978), pneumonia.
Huntz Hall, 78, American actor, heart failure.
Ed Herlihy, 89, American newsreel narrator.
Chuck Hinton, 59, American gridiron football player.
Mirra Komarovsky, 93, American sociologist.
Dolf van der Linden, 83, Dutch conductor of popular music.
Mick McGahey, 73, Scottish trade unionist and political activist, Chairman of the Communist Party of Great Britain (1974–1978).
Warren Miller, 74, American political scientist.
Svetlana Savyolova, 57, Soviet and Russian actress.

31
Giant Baba, 61, Japanese wrestler, liver failure.
Bill Luders, 89, American naval architect.
Charles M. Murphy, 85, American football, basketball and baseball player and coach.
Ahmad Azari Qomi, 74, Iranian cleric and ayatollah.
Fanély Revoil, 92, French opera singer.
Gabriel Ruiz, 90, Mexican songwriter.
Ilmari Tapiovaara, 84, Finnish furniture designer.
Ferdinand Thomas Unger, 84, American Army Lieutenant General.
Norm Zauchin, 69, American baseball player, prostate cancer.

References 

1999-01
 01